
Year 86 BC was a year of the pre-Julian Roman calendar. At the time it was known as the Year of the Consulship of Cinna and Marius/Flaccus (or, less frequently, year 668 Ab urbe condita). The denomination 86 BC for this year has been used since the early medieval period, when the Anno Domini calendar era became the prevalent method in Europe for naming years.

Events 
 By place 

 Roman Republic 
 First Mithridatic War
 March 1 – Sulla captures Athens from the Pontic army, removing the tyrant Aristion.
 Lucius Licinius Lucullus decisively defeats the Mithridatic fleet in the Battle of Tenedos.
 The Roman forces of Lucius Cornelius Sulla defeat the Pontic forces of Archelaus in the Battle of Chaeronea.
 The Dardani ally with Pontus and are defeated by Sulla soon after.

Births 
 October 1 – Sallust, Roman historian (d. 34 BC)
 Fausta Cornelia, twin sister of Faustus Cornelius Sulla, wife of Gaius Memmius and later of Titus Annius Milo
 Faustus Cornelius Sulla, Roman senator, son of the dictator Lucius Cornelius Sulla (d. 46 BC)

Deaths 
 January 13 – Gaius Marius, Roman general and politician (b. 157 BC)
 March 1 – Aristion, Greek philosopher and tyrant 
 Jin Midi, Chinese politician and co-regent (b. 134 BC)
 Sima Qian, Chinese historian (b. 145 BC)

References